The 2006–07 Czech 2. Liga was the 14th season of the 2. česká fotbalová liga, the second tier of the Czech football league.

Team changes

From 2. Liga
Promoted to Czech First League
 SK Kladno
 SK Dynamo České Budějovice

Relegated to Moravian-Silesian Football League
 Brno "B"

Relegated to Bohemian Football League
 Sparta Prague "B"

Relegated to Divize E
 Slavia Kroměříž

Relegated to 5. Liga (Pardubický kraj)
 Pardubice

Relegated
 Kunovice
 Xaverov

Folded
 FKD

To 2. Liga
Relegated from Czech First League
 FC Vysočina Jihlava
 FK Chmel Blšany

Promoted from Bohemian Football League
 Čáslav
 Bohemians 1905

Promoted from Moravian-Silesian Football League
 Jakubčovice
 Dosta Bystrc
 Třinec

Promoted from Divize B
 Sokolov

Promoted from 5. Liga (Moravskoslezský kraj)
 Opava

League standings

Top goalscorers

See also
 2006–07 Czech First League
 2006–07 Czech Cup

Notes

References

External links
 Official website 

Czech 2. Liga seasons
Czech
2006–07 in Czech football